Clawfinger is the third studio album by Swedish rap metal band Clawfinger, released on 29 September 1997 through WEA and MVG labels.

Background 
The first song on the album is "Two Sides", which expanded the band's reach by using female choir vocals and a Middle Eastern sound. The rest of the album continues with the band's typical aggressive voice and socio-political lyrics.

Clawfinger contains twelve songs with an additional three bonus tracks on the limited edition. Three singles were released (detailed below) and two videos ("Biggest & the Best" and "Two Sides").

The album was named after the band because the band members could not agree on a title. Zak Tell said in interviews that upon seeing the printed sleeve (when it was too late) he had the title idea "Third Time Lucky" and wished he had thought of it in time. This title was relevant as the cover depicts a revolver's cylinder with a single bullet that would be fired on pulling the trigger for the third time, as well as the album being the band's third album.

Track listing 
All tracks by Clawfinger.

Personnel 
 Tom Baker – mastering
 Clawfinger – producer
 Flesh Quartet – strings
 Alexander Kurlandsky – photography
 Adam Kviman – engineer
 Richard Mouser – guitar, engineer
 Sebastian Oberg – cello
 Erlend Ottem – guitar
 Peter Reardon – sound effects, vocals, multi instruments, producer
 Andre Skaug – bass guitar, water sticks
 Jocke Skog – bass guitar, guitar, keyboards, programming, backing vocals, mixing
 Zak Tell – vocals
 Bård Torstensen – guitar, piano, programming, sitar, backing vocals, tamboura

References 

Clawfinger albums
1997 albums